The 1911 Ice Hockey European Championship was the second edition of the ice hockey tournament for European countries associated to the International Ice Hockey Federation .  
 
The tournament was played between February 15, and February 17, 1911, in Berlin, Germany, and it was won by Bohemia.

Results

February 15

February 16

February 17

Final standings

Top Goalscorer

Jaroslav Jirkovský (Bohemia), 9 goals

References
 Euro Championship 1911

1910–11 in European ice hockey
1911
Ice Hockey European Championships
Ice Hockey European Championship
 European Championship
Sports competitions in Berlin
1910s in Berlin